Kõvaküla is a village in Mulgi Parish in Viljandi County in southern Estonia. It borders the villages Ainja, Äriküla, Univere, Karksi-Nuia and Karksi.

References

Villages in Viljandi County